Slavkovce is a Slavic toponym. It may refer to:

Slavkovce, Slovakia
Slavkovce, Kosovo